The United States Army has used military berets as headgear with various uniforms beginning in World War II. Since June 14, 2001, a black beret is worn by all U.S. Army troops unless the soldier is approved to wear a different distinctive beret. A maroon beret has been adopted as official headdress by the Airborne forces, a tan beret by the 75th Ranger Regiment, a brown beret by the Security Force Assistance Brigades, and a green beret by the Special Forces.

In 2011, the Army replaced the black wool beret with the patrol cap as the default headgear for the Army Combat Uniform.

In 2019, the Army proposed the creation of a new grey beret for USASOC soldiers qualified in psychological operations (PSYOP), but has yet to receive its official approval. In the meantime, grey berets are only issued to Army Junior ROTC cadets.

History

In the United States military, the beret was unofficially worn by a variety of special operations units during and following World War II. In the spring of 1951, the 10th and 11th Ranger Companies wore black berets during their training at Camp Carson, Colorado, before their deployment to Japan.

After the Vietnam War, morale in the U.S. Army waned. In response, from 1973 through 1979, the Department of the Army authorized local commanders to encourage morale-enhancing uniform distinctions. Consequently, many units embraced various colored berets, for example 
various armor and ranger units adopted the black beret. Similarly, many other units embraced various colored berets in an attempt to improve dwindling morale. In particular, the 1st Cavalry Division assigned various colored berets to its three-pronged TRICAP approach. In this implementation, armored cavalry, airmobile infantry, air cavalry, division artillery, and division support units all wore different colored berets, including black, light–blue, kelly–green, and red.

Various Army branch–specific berets were also worn by some soldiers in the 1970s which were dyed to match the heraldic colors of their branch.  Enlisted soldiers attached their regimental distinctive insignia while officers attached their polished metal rank insignia on these branch-specific berets positioned over the left eye.  By 1979, the Army put a stop to the use of berets by conventional forces, leaving only special forces and ranger units the authority to wear berets.

Black

The black beret was worn by various reconnaissance, ranger, and armored units in the 1960s and 70s. Today, the black beret is worn by regular soldiers of the U.S. Army.

In 1975, the black beret was officially authorized for wear by the newly created battalions of United States Army Rangers who had worn it unofficially during the Vietnam War.  Also in 1975, a unique black beret was authorized for wear by female soldiers but was of a different design than the one worn by male soldiers.

In 2001, the black beret became the primary headgear for both the service uniform (in garrison setting) and dress uniform for all United States Army troops unless the soldier is approved to wear a different distinctive beret. In 2011, the Army changed back to the patrol cap for primary wear with the utility uniform, with the beret remaining the headgear for the dress uniform.

Brown

The brown beret was created in 2018 for soldiers of the U.S. Army's then-new Security Force Assistance Command and its brigades or SFABs. Soldiers assigned to the command and its brigades are authorized to wear the brown beret—with a brigade specific beret flash and distinctive unit insignia (DUI)—to recognize these new specialized units whose core mission is to conduct training, advising, assisting, enabling, and accompanying operations with allied and partner nations.  According to an official U.S. Army article, "SFAB soldiers will be on the ground with their partners - fighting side-by-side with them in all conditions, so the brown beret symbolizes dirt or mud akin to the 'muddy boots' moniker given to leaders who are always out with the troops."

Maroon

In 1943 General Frederick Browning, commander of the British First Airborne Corps, granted the U.S. Army's 509th Parachute Infantry Battalion honorary membership in the British Parachute Regiment and authorized them to wear British-style maroon berets. During the Vietnam War, U.S. military advisers to Vietnamese airborne units often wore the Vietnamese French-style red beret.

With the Department of the Army policy in 1973 permitting local commanders to encourage morale-enhancing distinctions, airborne forces began to wear the maroon beret as their mark of distinction. This permission was rescinded in 1979 when the army Chief of Staff, General Edward C. Meyer, required all units to adhere to the uniform regulation. On 28 November 1980, updated uniform regulations authorized airborne (parachute) units to resume wearing the maroon beret. In the interim, airborne units wore the Hot Weather Cap (olive-drab hats resembling a baseball cap) with their parachutist badge and airborne background trimming affixed above their rank insignia with the combat uniform and the Airborne Insignia on the garrison cap with the service dress uniform.

Tan

On 14 June 2001, U.S. Army Rangers assigned to the 75th Ranger Regiment and the Airborne and Ranger Training Brigade were authorized to wear a distinctive tan beret to replace the black berets that had recently become the army-wide standard. The color was chosen by the members of the 75th Ranger Regiment as being similar to other elite units with similar missions worldwide, notably the British, Australian and New Zealand Special Air Service regiments.

The change in color also required modification of the associated beret flashes worn by the Ranger units, changing the borders from white to black in order to provide better contrast to the lighter beret.

Green

In the United States Army, the green beret may be worn only by soldiers who have graduated from the Special Forces Qualification Course, signifying, along with the Special Forces Tab, they are Special Forces qualified paratroopers.

The 10th Special Forces Group (Airborne) (10th SFG) had many veterans of World War II and Korea in its ranks when it was formed in 1952. Members of the 10th SFG began to unofficially wear a variety of berets while training, some favoring the red or maroon airborne beret, the black beret, or the British Commando green beret. In 1953, a beret whose design was based on that of the Canadian Army pattern, and which was rifle-green in color, was chosen for wear by Special Forces units.

Their new headgear was first worn at a retirement parade at Fort Bragg on 12 June 1955 for Lt. Gen. Joseph P. Cleland, the now-former commander of the XVIII Airborne Corps. Onlookers thought that the commandos were a foreign delegation from NATO.

In 1956 Gen. Paul D. Adams, the post commander at Fort Bragg, North Carolina, banned its wear, even though it was worn on the sly when units were in the field or deployed overseas. This was reversed on 25 September 1961 by Department of the Army Message 578636, which designated the green beret as the exclusive headgear of the Army Special Forces.

When visiting the Special Forces at Fort Bragg on 12 October 1961, President John F. Kennedy asked Brig. Gen. William P. Yarborough to make sure that the men under his command wore green berets for the visit. Later that day, Kennedy sent a memorandum that included the line: "I am sure that the green beret will be a mark of distinction in the trying times ahead". By America's entry into the Vietnam War, the green beret had become a symbol of excellence throughout the U.S. Army. On 11 April 1962 in a White House memorandum to the United States Army, President Kennedy reiterated his view: "The green beret is a symbol of excellence, a badge of courage, a mark of distinction in the fight for freedom". Previously, both Yarborough and Edson Raff had petitioned the Pentagon to allow wearing of the green beret, to no avail.

See also
United States military beret flash
Military beret

References

United States Army uniforms
Military hats